The Pechiguera or Punta Pechiguera Lighthouse is an active lighthouse on the Canary island of Lanzarote. It is the second lighthouse to be built at Punta Pechiguera, which is at the south-western end of the island.

History 
The original lighthouse which was designed by the engineer Juan de León y Castillo opened in 1866, and consists of a  tower at the front of a single storey keeper's house. It was deactivated in 1988, following the construction of the new lighthouse, and in 2002 was registered as a Bien de Interés Cultural in the listing for Las Palmas.

In conjunction with the lights at Tostón and Punta Martiño, it marks the narrow La Bocayna strait that separates the islands of Lanzarote and Fuerteventura.

Punta Pechiguera is a barren promontory of volcanic rocks; originally quite isolated it is now being encroached upon by coastal developments from the Playa Blanca resort. A coastal walkway links the lighthouse with the centre of the resort, the majority of which consists of a paved promenade or esplanade along the seafront.

In 2008, Pechiguera in conjunction with five other lighthouses was depicted in a set of six commemorative stamps by the Spanish postal service Correos.

See also 

 List of lighthouses in the Canary Islands
 List of lighthouses in Spain

References

External links 
 
 Comisión de faros
 Autoridad Portuaria de Santa Cruz de Tenerife

Lighthouses in the Canary Islands
Lighthouses completed in 1988
Bien de Interés Cultural landmarks in the Province of Las Palmas
Buildings and structures in Lanzarote